The 2004 Campeón de Campeones was the 40th edition of the Campeón de Campeones. The match-up featured Pachuca, the winners of the Apertura 2003, and UNAM, the winners of the Clausura 2004. It was staged over two legs.

Teams

Venues

Matches

First leg

Second leg

References
Mexico - Statistics of season 1988/1989. (RSSSF)
Mexico - Statistics of Mexican Supercup. (RSSSF)

Cam
Campeón de Campeones
August 2004 sports events in Mexico